Dendroid is malware that affects Android OS and targets the mobile platform.

It was first discovered in early of 2014 by Symantec and appeared in the underground for sale for $300.
Certain features were noted as being used in Dendroid, such as the ability to hide from emulators at the time.
When first discovered in 2014 it was one of the most sophisticated Android remote administration tools known at that time.
It was one of the first Trojan applications to get past Google's Bouncer and caused researchers to warn about it being easier to create Android malware due to it.
It also seems to have followed in the footsteps of Zeus and SpyEye by having simple-to-use command and control panels.
The code appeared to be leaked somewhere around 2014.
It was noted that an apk binder was included in the leak, which provided a simple way to bind Dendroid to legitimate applications.

It is capable of:

 Deleting call logs 
 Opening web pages 
 Dialing any number
 Recording calls 
 SMS intercepting 
 Uploading images and video
 Opening an application 
 Performing denial-of-service attacks
 Changing the command and control server

See also
 Botnet
 Mirai
 Shedun
 Zombie (computer science)
 Kill system

References

Android (operating system) malware
Botnets
Denial-of-service attacks
Mobile malware